The NUS High School of Math and Science, also known as NUS High School or NUSH, is a specialised independent high school in Singapore offering a six-year Integrated Programme (IP) leading to the NUS High School Diploma. Its parent university is the National University of Singapore.

The school offers an accelerated mathematics and science curriculum integrated with language, arts, humanities, sports, in a modular system. Over 70% of its graduates have pursued Science, Technology, Engineering and Medicine-related courses in university.

Curriculum

Academic curriculum
NUS High School is an Integrated Programme school, which allows students to bypass the GCE O Levels. However, unlike other Integrated Programme schools, it does not offer GCE A Level or International Baccalaureate programmes. Instead, it offers an NUS High School Diploma, which is recognized by all universities in Singapore, as well as by universities worldwide.

The diploma's curriculum is based on a modular system similar to its parent university NUS. Core modules are compulsory, elective modules help deepen the student's knowledge and may be compulsory for a major in a particular subject, and enrichment modules are purely for the student's interests. The school uses the cumulative average point (CAP) system, a 5-point system similar to the grade point average used in the United States. This is unlike most other schools in Singapore, where subjects are graded according to the British GCSE System.

The school's mathematics and science curriculums are accelerated. Topics are usually covered earlier than other schools. For example, the mole is introduced in Year 2 instead of Year 3, kinematics in Year 1 and Year 2 instead of Year 5, calculus in Year 3, and molecular biology and genetics in Year 3 instead of Year 6. Examples of the accelerated mathematics curriculum include sections on solutions of equations introduced in Year 1 instead of Year 3, and three-dimensional vectors and matrices in Years 2 and 4 instead of Year 5.

The school offers elective programmes which may or may not count to the CAP.  Students may choose up to two electives which will be held after the core modules.

The school also offers honours courses in the Specialization Stage for mathematical and scientific disciplines. The curriculum in these honours courses usually covers university material, such as linear algebra in mathematics, calculus-based electromagnetism in physics, organic synthesis and spectroscopy in chemistry, and proteomics in biology.

To graduate with the NUS High School diploma, students must take mathematics and at least two science subjects (including computer studies) as a major. Students may choose to take a fourth subject from any subject group (sciences, humanities & the arts), or take any mathematics or science subject at the honours level. In addition, students must complete an Advanced Research Project under the school's Da Vinci Research Programme. Finally, students must have a CAP above 2.5 (C+). Students are also encouraged to take Advanced Placement and SAT examinations in their senior years for credits for admission into foreign universities, though these are not necessary for graduation.

Research curriculum
All students go through a research curriculum called the Da Vinci Programme. As part of the curriculum, all students must complete an Advanced Research Project which is included the student's school grades.

Sports 
NUS High School offers various sports to choose from as part of its options for co-curricular activities. The compulsory physical education modules from Years 1 to 6 also covers sports such as soccer, netball, basketball, badminton, floorball, baseball, outdoor education, and so on.

Houses 
Students are sorted at random into one of four houses upon matriculation. The four houses, named Faraday, Fibonacci, Fleming and Nobel, bear the colours yellow, red, blue and green respectively.  An annual house challenge is held between the houses.

Campus

Location

Currently, the NUS High School campus sits on 4.7 hectares of land off Clementi Ave 1. The school moved operations from its temporary campus at the former Raffles Junior College grounds at Mount Sinai Road in 2005.

Building features 
Due to the school's specialization in mathematics and science, the building features many designs relating to mathematics and science. These include, but are not limited to, a drawing of the four DNA bases (ACGT) on the roof of the concourse, a timeline of major mathematical discoveries, and colored metal shades to represent the digits of pi.

NUS High School Residence (Boarding School)

The campus includes a boarding school (NUS High School Residence) consisting of two blocks that can accommodate around 500 residents. Facilities include studying areas and rooms, gym, pantries, media rooms (TV and relaxation), game rooms, music rooms and laundry rooms. The boarding school is also open to scholars studying within or outside of the school and serves as the site for the school's boarding programme.

Students are required to live in the NUS High Boarding School in Year 5.

NUS Libraries
The library at NUS High School (known as the Node) is part of the NUS Library system. NUS High School students and staff can access the loaning, catalogue and transaction resources of NUS Libraries from the Node. NUS teaching staff can request books in other NUS Libraries to be transferred to the Node. All NUS High School students have full electronic access to all journals available at NUS Libraries.

Key partners

Parent institution
 National University of Singapore (NUS)
NUSH is the only high school in Singapore to be supported by a parent university. For example, NUS provides the school with a swimming pool for water-related sports, and much of the school's students graduate to NUS.

Principals
 2005 – 2007: Associate Professor Lai Yee Hing
 2007 – 2015: Dr Hang Kim Hoo
 2016 – 2019: Lee Bee Yann
 2020 – Present: Soh Lai Leng Magdalen

Deputy principals
 2019 – Present: Doreen Gan

See also
 Education in Singapore

References

External links
 

Educational institutions established in 2005
2005 establishments in Singapore
Schools offering Integrated Programme in Singapore
Secondary schools in Singapore
National University of Singapore
University-affiliated secondary schools